Put Up Your Dukes  was a sports television talk show that began September 4, 2007, on NFL Network. It features former NFL center, Jamie Dukes. The show aired from Tuesdays through Fridays at 6:30 p.m. Eastern.

It is unclear when the show was cancelled, but College Football Now has assumed its time slot (expanded to an hour each day) and no further airings are scheduled.  Dukes remains under contract to NFL Network for other assignments.

Contributors
Other contributors included former two-sport athlete Deion Sanders, NFL.com writers Adam Schefter and Pat Kirwan, college football analyst Charles Davis, and NFL on Fox commentator Brian Baldinger.

Format
Put Up Your Dukes debated the news of the day in the NFL. The show featured an interactive component through NFL.com allowing viewers to send questions to Dukes. Some were read and answered by Dukes on air.

American sports television series
NFL Network original programming
2007 American television series debuts
2008 American television series endings
2000s American television talk shows